Leonardos Philaras (c. 1595 – 1673) (Greek: Λεονάρδος Φιλαρᾶς, Leonardos Filaras, French: Leonard Philara also known as Villeret, Villare) was a Greek Athenian scholar, politician, diplomat and advisor to the French court. He was also an early advocate for Greek independence.

Biography
Leonardos Philaras was born of Greek origins in Athens in 1595 to a distinguished family. He moved to Rome at a young age where he was educated, he eventually became ambassador to the French court from the Duke of Parma. Philaras spent much of his career in persuading Western European intellectuals to support Greek independence.

See also
Greek scholars in the Renaissance

References

External links

 

1595 births
1673 deaths
Writers from Athens
Renaissance writers
Diplomats from Athens
17th-century Greek politicians
17th-century Greek writers
17th-century Greek people
Emigrants from the Ottoman Empire to the Duchy of Parma and Piacenza
Expatriates of the Duchy of Parma and Piacenza in France